Aakash Ahuja is an Indian actor who works in Hindi films and television. 
Ahuja is best known for his portrayal of Viren Narang in the film Pal Pal Dil Ke Paas and Purab Singhania in Thapki Pyar Ki 2. He is currently seen as Ayaan Mittal in Faltu.

Career
Ahuja has been part of many TV series including O Gujariya: Badlein Chal Duniya, Qubool Hai, Box Cricket League and played the lead role of Vivek in TV Ke Uss Paar.

He made his web debut in 2016 with Voot's Shaadi Boys playing Neil Chaturvedi.

In 2019, he made his film debut with Pal Pal Dil Ke Paas. He played the negative lead, Viren Narang.

Ahuja is best known for his portrayal of Purab Singhania in Thapki Pyar Ki 2. He is currently seen as Ayaan Mittal in Faltu.

Filmography

Films

Television

Web series

References

External links
 

1991 births
Living people
Indian male television actors
21st-century Indian male actors